Limnaecia charactis is a moth of the family Cosmopterigidae. It is known from Australia.

References

Limnaecia
Moths described in 1897
Taxa named by Edward Meyrick
Moths of Australia